Forsinard is a hamlet in the county of Sutherland in the Highland area of Scotland. It is located on the A897 road in Strath Halladale. It is served by a railway station on the Far North Line.  The local hotel closed several years ago, but there is now a b&b just across the level crossing.

Forsinard is situated in the Flow Country, an area of peat bog which straddles the borders of Caithness and Sutherland. The  Fosinard estate was purchased in 1977 by Basil Baird. The Royal Society for the Protection of Birds runs a  nature reserve and a visitor centre at Forsinard. The Forsinard Flows national nature reserve attracts a large range of birds and wildlife.

Rail transport
 
Forsinard Railway Station lies on the picturesque Far North Line, located north of Kinbrace and south of Altnabreac.

It was opened by the Highland Railway on 28 July 1874. From 1 January 1923 it was owned by the London Midland and Scottish Railway. The station is currently managed by ScotRail. The original two storey station building, which is located on the northbound platform, is used as the RSPB visitor centre.

References

External links 
Forsinard Flows on RSPB website

Populated places in Sutherland